The .41 Rimfire Cartridge was first introduced by the National Arms Company in 1863 and was also known as the .41 Short and the .41-100.  In most designations like this, the second number refers to the black powder load, though in this case it means "41 hundredths of an inch".

The .41 Short was created with the intention that it be used in a small, single-shot derringer, which likely is the reason for the very low ballistics (most derringers were and are chambered for cartridges that were not originally intended to be used in such a small weapon).  Remington Arms began producing their famous Remington Model 95 over/under double barrel derringer chambered for the .41 Rimfire cartridge in 1866.

In 1873 the slightly more powerful .41 Long (rimfire) and the .41 short Colt (central fire) was introduced in the Colt New Line pocket revolver.

Performance

According to Cartridges of the World, the .41 Rimfire consisted of a 130 grain (8.4 g) lead bullet propelled by 13 grains (0.8 g) of black powder in its original load. However, more recently firearms writer Holt Bodinson has disputed these findings. He states that his testing showed the 130 grain bullet traveled at  so producing  of energy - a significant difference in ballistic energy from the earlier tests. The difference in findings can potentially be attributed to variances in the specific ammunition fired or measuring equipment used.

Moreover, in the guns Magazine's article "Henry Deringer’s Pocket Pistol" by John E. Parsons
there is an interesting test to be read.
With the classic double-barreled Deringer with 3-inch barrels,
two types of cartridges were fired,
The old yellow-and-blue boxed Western Lubaloy, and a new batch of Brazilian, commissioned by Navy Arms;
Both with the normal 130 gr bullet.
At 10 feet, both bullets passed through a 5-inch soaked phone directory,
also passed through a 3/4-inch piece of pine.
Velocity was measured at 10 feet from muzzle with a PACT Professional Chronograph.
The Western Lubaloys averaged 532 fps, which is 82 lb/sqf.
The modern Navy Arms gave 621, for 111 lb/sqf.

See also
 List of handgun cartridges
 10 mm caliber

References

Pistol and rifle cartridges
Rimfire cartridges
Derringers